Penetopteryx taeniocephalus, also known as the oceanic pipefish is a species of marine fish belonging to the family Syngnathidae. The species can be found inhabiting coral rubble and gravel in many areas of the Indo-Pacific including Madagascar, Mauritius, the Philippines, Indonesia, and Vanuatu. Its diet likely consists of small crustaceans such as copepods. Reproduction occurs through ovoviviparity in which the males brood eggs before giving live birth.

References

External links 

 Penetopteryx taeniocephalus at FishBase
 Penetopteryx taeniocephalus at Fishes of Australia

Syngnathidae
Fish described in 1881